Antarctonomus is a genus of ground beetles in the family Carabidae. This genus has a single species, Antarctonomus complanatus. It is found in South America, Argentina, and Chile.

References

Migadopinae